The Evermoor Chronicles is a British television series that aired on Disney Channel. It was produced by Lime Pictures with filming taking place in the spring of 2014. The series premiered on 10 October 2014 on Disney Channel in the United Kingdom, on 17 October 2014 on Disney Channel in the United States and Family Channel in Canada, and on 31 October 2014 on Disney Channel in Australia and New Zealand.

On 19 March 2015, the miniseries was picked up for a full series of a further 20 episodes and was confirmed under the new title of The Evermoor Chronicles as a continuation to the original. On 5 September 2015, filming for the first season was completed. An announcement by Disney EMEA at the International Kids Emmys confirmed The Evermoor Chronicles would be returning for a second series of 12 episodes, after attracting 5.3 million viewers in its first quarter on air.

To run alongside the main TV series, a web series of mini-episodes called the Evermoor Confidential Chronicles was launched. Each episode features one of the characters recording a vlog in a secret scene taking place in-between each episode from the main series. Each one gives a spoiler of what is to come in the next episode of the TV series. The series follows Tara and Bella Crossley with Otto's aid as they try to solve mysteries across Evermoor and to protect Evermoor from the evil forces.

Plot
The miniseries and the first series star Tara Crossley, an American teen who moves from the United States to an English village called Evermoor. As her mother and stepfather unpack at their new home, Tara, her brother, and her British step-siblings adjust to their new life.

The second series stars Bella as she tries to apply for fashion school in London. When Davorin, an evil man who is trapped inside a magic mirror, breaks Ludo into splinters, Bella and her friends must find Ludo's splinters before wish making chaos begins across the village of Evermoor.

Characters 
 Tara Crossley (Naomi Sequeira, pilot – season 1) is the only member of the family who has been to Evermoor before to visit her aunt Bridget when she was little and is the most excited about living there. She is Jake's sister and Seb and Bella's step-sister. She enjoys writing stories and because of this she has an overactive imagination. In the show she solves mysteries in the manor where she meets the founders and finds out later on that she is the Supreme Everine, but she gives her identity over Bella to trick Esmerelda. Over the course of the series, she becomes the main enemy of the founders and she loses her powers but tries her hardest to protect Evermoor without them, during these times she smashed the founder lantern stopping the third founder from being released, including keeping her friends from being turned to stone statuettes and regains them in the season finale. Prior to the second season, she becomes the "Taylor Swift of the book world" as Bella says, and leaves Evermoor, as well as Cameron.
 Cameron Marsh (Finney Cassidy) is Tara and Bella's love interest but has chosen Tara and is a Circle Page for the Everines. His mother Sarah was an Everine who went missing prior to the series, only to discover that she had been turned into a tree. He is shown to have helped Esmeralda to cheat Tara so he can find his mother. He has a magical spider, Flynn, that makes the golden thread whose life force is connected to his which hurts him if Flynn were ever harmed. Over the course of season 1, Cameron is turned into a tree, but turns back once Tara kisses him, but knowing he can never kiss her again, he intends to pursue a relationship with her, at the end of the first season he becomes an enemy of the founders and as Tara's powers are restored, the curse is broken and they share a proper kiss. In the second season, Cameron and Tara have broken up (prior to the second season) as she has left the village, and is no longer looking after Flynn. Cameron spends the second season trying to help repair Ludo as he also becomes interested in Alice, whom he comes to love.
 Bella Crossley (Georgia Lock) is Seb's twin sister and Jake and Tara's step-sister. She often gets jealous of how close Tara and Seb are and to make up for the lack of attention she gets from Seb, she flirts with Cameron, but eventually calls it off once realizing that their love was just an illusion. Bella poses as the Supreme Everine to protect Tara's identity, but is eventually found out. Later on in the series, she gains an ability to smell emotions from entering the tapestry, though they seem to be gone in the second season for the loss of the tapestry. She is also shown to be a good dancer. At the end of the first season she becomes an enemy of the founders. In the second season Bella takes the lead role as she prepares to leave Evermoor for fashion school. She decides to stay after she causes Ludo to be splintered and works to fix him and apply for fashion school again. She becomes smitten with Iggi and remains oblivious to the fact that Otto loves her. Over the course of the second season, she find out who Davorin is, as she says "it's Davorin isn't it" and "let me guess...Davorin" she becomes an enemy of Davorin. In the end of the season, she risks her own life to bring the splinters back to her loved ones and the rest of the villagers, and she chooses Otto to leave Evermoor with her after realizing her own feelings for him. 
 Sebastian "Seb" Crossley (George Sear, pilot – season 1) is Bella's twin brother and Jake and Tara's step-brother. He likes to have evidence and proof, before making any conclusions, and keeps Tara grounded. He is quite geeky and is in love with Sorsha. He seems to have a very strong relationship with Tara, which makes Bella very jealous. He seems to care very much for both his sisters but probably enjoys Tara's company more than that of his own sister. It is shown that he thinks Evermoor is full of nonsense and idiots, but after discovering magic, his whole world of logic crumbles around him, but Sorsha helps him learn to cope with and understand Evermoor's magic, and eventually becomes Circle Page in order to be with her. At the end of the first season he becomes an enemy of the founders. Prior to the second season, he wishes with Sorsha to travel the world together.
 Sorsha Doyle (Jordan Loughran, pilot – season 1) is the daughter of Mayor Doyle. Sorsha starts out as an Everine-in-training who immediately falls in love with Seb despite their no boys rule, she promises Seb that she would leave the Circle for him, but after Seb is erased from history, she forgets about her promise and is chosen as the next Everine as he is restored. Despite being chosen, she tries hard to maintain a relationship with Seb in secret while attending her duties as an Everine, only to reveal their relationship to everyone in order to keep Seb and his family in Evermoor and is kicked out of the Circle. Her position is later restored in order for the third founder to take over her body, but while her love for Seb protects her, she loses the fight after discovering that Seb had kissed another girl and becomes the third founder, she is later freed by Tara. She leaves with Seb prior to Season Two to travel the world.
 Jake Crossley (Georgie Farmer) – Jake is Tara's brother and Seb and Bella's step-brother. He is good friends with Ludo and together they enjoy solving 'mini mysteries', but Jake ends up taking the brunt of Ludo's many plans and activities. In Season Two, he returns to Evermoor at the request of Ludo, but becomes more interested in Lacie. He also finds out about the magic of Evermoor in the second season after discovering that Ludo is a ghost. He then decides to stay in Evermoor to grow closer to Lacie, and to help save Ludo.
 Ludicrous "Ludo" Carmichael (Alex Starke) – Ludo is Jake's best friend and the son of Crimson, he spends most of the series teaching Jake about various items, games and mysteries in Evermoor, most of which he doesn't entirely understand, which causes the two to constantly get into some form of trouble. In Season Two, he adopts a dog and names it after Jake because of how much he misses him. He is turned into a ghost by Davorin after he followed Iggi into the caves where Davorin was kept. Over the course of the second season, he and his friends search far and wide across Evermoor for his splinters. At the end of the season, he is restored to his human form.
 Otto (Sammy Moore, season 1–2) Otto is a teen demigod and The Sacred Snoot of Evermoor. After causing 100 days of thunder and stealing his father's chariot, he was banished from his home and forced to live on Earth in the form of an owl-like being called the Sacred Snoot for a remaining 1000 years as of the beginning of the series. Tara becomes his first mortal friend. During their first meeting, it seems that Otto is resistant to Cotton's gillypox. He secretly likes Bella, as Tara, Seb, Sorsha and Cameron know while Bella is unaware. He is shown to be very intelligent and a good dancer. He also has an ex-girlfriend named Valentina, the demigoddess of love, who he is forced to be apart from because of a separation spell his father cast on her, which will wear off after his 1000 years, then they will be reunited. He spends the first season helping Tara with Evermoorian mythology and to better understand its magic, as well as with her various plans to protect Evermoor. At the end of the season, his banishment is lifted as he learns the value of humanity by sacrificing his life for his friends and is revived in the season finale, where his father grants his new friends a wish. In the second season, Otto competes for Bella's affections with Iggi, his little brother. He defeats Davorin in the finale, and he is also chosen by Bella to leave the village with her because they love each other. They leave to London on a bus, whilst Bella goes to fashion school, where they finally kiss. 
 Lacie Fairburn (India Ria Amarteifio, season 1–2) – Lacie's parents are committed to the traditions of the village, and intend for her to become an Everine someday, however, she would rather become the mayor. She becomes the first founder later in the series, but Tara frees her of it. In the second season, she is shown to be having an interest in Jake after he returns to Evermoor. She teases him throughout the series, showing her attraction to him. Later, she accidentally releases the final crypt stone after hearing Iggi sing the incantation. In the end of the season, she and Jake seem to be together. 
 Iggi (Ben Radcliffe, season 2) – Iggi is Otto's younger brother who is the main cause of the threat of Davorin in Season Two after he wishes for a cure for him and becomes Davorin's servant. He is shown to have feelings for Bella and is at odds with his brother for her affection. He is shown to be a good wrestler. He also happens to be one of those boys who woos and takes girls he thinks are pretty. He is shown to be condescending towards his friends during the times he served Davorin. In the end of the season, Iggi is released from his curse and remains friends with Bella after she chooses Otto.
 Alice Crossley (Scarlett Murphy) (season 2) – Alice is Bella's cousin who moves into the manor in Season Two with her father. She is shown to have a troubled past with the wrong crowd, which her father, Jed, worries about. She is Cameron's love interest in the second season and they eventually become a couple at the end of the season.
Rod Crossley (Dan Fredenburgh) (pilot)- Rod is the father of Bella and Seb and stepfather of Tara and Jake. Rod spends his time trying to legally prevent the Circle and Mayor Doyle's comings and goings from his new home only to fail as Evermoorian laws go against his actions. Rod is the only character from the pilot that does not appear in season 1, with his absence explained as his work always keeps him busy, and later works to move his family back to London. In season 2, he moves his family, except Bella, back to London and leaves the house to his younger brother Jed.
Fiona Crossley (Belinda Stewart-Wilson, pilot-season 1) is the mother of Tara and Jake and stepmother of Bella and Seb, and author of the Tallulah Brinkworth stories which she bases off of Tara. Unaccepting of Evermoorian customs and tradition, Fiona tries to rationally explain ways to improve Evermoor only to be turned away by everyone she speaks to as her ideas cannot apply. She does however allow the Everines full access to the manor and use of the tapestry, much to her chagrin, and unknown to her is that the only Everines that live in the house are the founders.
 Aunt Bridget (Georgie Glen, pilot – season 1) is Tara's maternal great aunt. She was the leader of the Everines. She faked her death so Tara can follow her destiny. Later in the first season, it is revealed that she had an older sister named Agatha who was lost to the Moors because the Circle predicted her demise and refused to save her because the rules forbid altering destiny. This leads to her plotting revenge against them by using Tara to turn Cameron's mother into a tree after she discovers her plan and later tricks Tara into giving her Supreme powers over to her in order to create her perfect Evermoor. She later gives away her essence to the Founders in order to complete her plan, who then control her after her plan fails, which disables her hands, preventing her from ever sewing again. She comes to regret her decision after seeing Bella nearly suffer the same fate as Agatha and blows her own cover to the Circle. She hands her power back over to Tara after her essence is returned to her and later leaves for Hollowfall at the end of the first season with Agatha, thanks to Tara who forgives her.
 Crimson Carmichael (Margaret Cabourn-Smith) - Housekeeper Crimson is apparently the 'Former Housekeeper', and the mother of Ludo, but they don't seem to be leaving the manor any time soon. In season 1, Fiona rehires Crimson and she takes on odd jobs throughout Evermoor, in the house, the school and the Stumpy Plum store. She is Jed's love interest in Season Two. 
 Mayor Chester Doyle (Clive Rowe) – Chester is the father of Sorsha and has three jobs; Mayor, lawyer, teacher as well as owning a store called The Stumpy Plum. He disapproves of Sorsha's relationship with Seb, but chooses to keep it secret as it would cause her to be expelled from the circle. It is revealed that he was once a Circle Page in 1985 who was disgraced after the mayor before him destroyed his love for music and his careless actions nearly destroyed the town, causing him to hold a tight grip on his appreciation for music thanks to his past self performing his old song at the prom and begins bending his own rules for the better.
 Esmerelda Dwyer (Sharon Morgan, pilot – season 1) is the new leader of the Everines after aunt Bridget 'died'. She is quite mysterious and very mean to Tara. She also has a strange preference for Bogvine tea. After losing the Golden Thread, she disbands the circle briefly, only to reinstate it after finding more, where she predicts the Supreme Everine losing her powers to another, but mistakes Bella for the Supreme Everine. She becomes the second founder later in the series who uses her position as leader to manipulate and later betray the Circle in order to revive the third Founder, but Tara frees her of it. Prior to the second season, she becomes a baker.
 Jed Crossley (Ben Hull) (season 2) – Jed is Alice's father and Bella's uncle who moves him and his daughter into Evermoor Manor in the second season after his brother and his family move out. He is hesitant about letting Bella stay with them at first, but allows it. He is the village's new sheriff, which he takes very seriously. He is very overprotective of Alice, and tries his best to parent her. His love interest is Crimson.
 Davorin (Christopher Brand, season 2) – Davorin is the main antagonist of the second season. He is a wishmaker and seeks to get revenge on the people of Evermoor for being trapped inside a magic mirror. He becomes a major threat to Evermoor after Iggi looks for a healing wish and ordering Iggi to raise five crypt stones in order to be free and to destroy the village. Despite being trapped inside the magic mirror, he is able to teleport between mirrors across Evermoor. This is how he communicates with Iggi.
Cotton Lively (Jennie Eggleton, season 1)- Cotton Lively is a 17th-century Everine-in-training with Gillypox who was denied her destiny of joining the Circle and swore revenge. She is accidentally freed by Tara after she saves her sister Bella from being consumed by the tapestry. She returns home after Tara realizes Cotton's dream of fulfilling her destiny and is chosen to be an Everine.
Valentina (Olivia Holt, season 1)- Valentina is the Goddess of love and Otto's ex-girlfriend, who believed that Otto put a separation spell on her for no reason, keeping her from going to Earth with him. She returns when Otto is transformed into a statuette and she threatens to break him. She realizes her mistake when it turns out that it was Otto's father who cursed her and frees Otto from his curse with a kiss. She returns briefly in the season finale after Otto's sacrifice to warn everyone about the founders and is immediately sent back by them.
Agatha (Katie Hartland, season 1)- Agatha is the princess of Hollowfall and Bridget's older sister, believed to have been dead the entire time. She was summoned by Tara and Sebastian to defeat the founders, at the end of the first season. She and Bridget are reunited and leave for Hollowfall at the end of the season.

Episodes

Series 1 Pilot (2014)

Series 1 (2015–2016)

Series 2 (2017) 

Series 2 of The Evermoor Chronicles was confirmed via Disney Channel UK's 2017 video on YouTube. Main characters Georgia Lock, Sammy Moore, Finney Cassidy, Georgie Farmer, Alex Starke, Margaret Cabourn-Smith, Clive Rowe, and India Ria Amarteifio return. New additions to the main cast include Ben Radcliffe as Iggi, Otto's brother, Scarlett Murphy as Alice Crossley, Bella's cousin, Ben Hull as Jed Crossley, Bella's uncle and Alice's father, and Christopher Brand as Davorin, an evil man trapped inside a magic mirror. A brand new plot, opening theme song, and new cast members are made into the second series. The new series premiered Monday, May 8, 2017.

References

External links
 
 

English-language television shows
Television about magic
Witchcraft in television
Disney Channel (British and Irish TV channel) original programming
2014 British television series debuts
2017 British television series endings
British children's fantasy television series
2010s British children's television series
Television series by All3Media
Television series by Disney